Forbes Park is a private subdivision, gated community, and barangay in Makati, Metro Manila, Philippines. Established in 1949, Forbes Park was named after William Cameron Forbes, the fifth American Governor-General of the Philippines during the American Insular Government.

The subdivision is divided into Forbes Park North and Forbes Park South by McKinley Road and is bounded roughly by Epifanio de los Santos Avenue to the northwest, Taguig (Fort Bonifacio which includes Bonifacio Global City) to the east, the Maricaban Creek to the south and southeast, and Acacia Avenue/Dasmariñas Village to the west.

It was the first gated village in the Philippines to be developed by Ayala Corporation, Forbes Park was a catalyst for urban development in Makati. Forbes Park is home to the Manila Golf and Country Club and the Manila Polo Club. It has been called the "Beverly Hills of Manila" and many of the country's wealthiest families, as well as foreign diplomats, live there.   
 
The Santuario de San Antonio Parish, a Franciscan church, and San Antonio Plaza, a small commercial center, lie between North and South Forbes Park. Meanwhile, the Church of the Holy Trinity, an Anglican-Episcopalian pro-cathedral, is just across the street.

References

Gated communities in Metro Manila
Barangays of Metro Manila
Makati